The women's 800 metres at the 2013 World Championships in Athletics was held at the Luzhniki Stadium on 15–18 August.

The first woman to break 2:00 was Hildegard Falck in 1971. At this meet, it almost took 2:00 to get into the semi-final.  Through the first three heats, the slowest automatic qualifier was Halima Hachlaf at 2:00.04, with each race being split at low 57.  In the final heat Eunice Jepkoech Sum managed to maintain order, splitting at just under a more leisurely 59 and bringing the three qualifiers in slower than the slowest time qualifier, Lenka Masná at 2:00.31. At that, world leader Francine Niyonsaba, returning medalists Caster Semenya and Janeth Jepkosgei were all missing.

In the final Alysia Montaño displayed tactics reminiscent of Johnny Gray, taking the race out in 26.80 and 56.06 splits opening up as much as a 15-meter lead on the field.  Montaño hit the 600 at 1:26.45 with the lead but as she was slowing that's still a long way to get home.  Sum had spent most of the last lap second to Montaño, but when defending champion Mariya Savinova tried to go past her at the head of the straight, she responded and held off the challenge.  Both of them passed a dying Montaño 40 meters out with the rest of the field gaining rapidly. As she was passed on the inside by teammate Brenda Martinez, Montaño tossed herself at the finish line, collapsing to the track in fourth as Martinez took the bronze.

In 2015, Savinova and Ekaterina Poistogova were recommended for lifetime bans dating back to the 2012 Olympics as part of the wholesale Russian performance enhancing drug scandal. On February 10, 2017 the Court of Arbitration for Sport (Cas) officially disqualified Savinova's results backdated to July 2010.  When medal reallocations were decided, Montaño was given the bronze medal and Martinez the silver.

Records
Prior to the competition, the records were as follows:

Qualification standards

Schedule

Results

Heats
Qualification: First 3 in each heat (Q) and the next 4 fastest (q) advanced to the semifinals.

Semifinals
Qualification: First 3 in each heat (Q) and the next 2 fastest (q) advanced to the final.

Final
The final was started at 17:50.

References

External links
800 metres results at IAAF website

800 metres
800 metres at the World Athletics Championships
2013 in women's athletics